Keldrimäe (Estonian for "Cellar Hill") is a subdistrict in the district of Kesklinn (Midtown), Tallinn, the capital of Estonia. It has a population of 4,747.

Gallery

References

External links

Subdistricts of Tallinn
Kesklinn, Tallinn